USS Skenandoa has been the name of more than one United States Navy ship, and may refer to:

, later YTM-336, a harbor tug in service from 1943 to 1946
, a harbor tug in service since 1975

See also
 

United States Navy ship names